Boone County may refer to:

 Boone County, Arkansas
 Boone County, Illinois
 Boone County, Indiana
 Boone County, Iowa 
 Boone County, Kentucky
 Boone County, Missouri
 Boone County, Nebraska
 Boone County, West Virginia
 USS Boone County (LST-389)